An election to Dublin County Council in the electoral county of Dún Laoghaire–Rathdown within Dublin County took place on 27 June 1991 as part of that year's Irish local elections. 28 councillors were elected from 7 local electoral areas on the system of proportional representation by means of the single transferable vote for a five-year term of office. It was one of three electoral counties within Dublin County at this election, the others being Fingal and South Dublin.

The councillors elected for the electoral areas of Ballybrack, Blackrock and Dún Laoghaire also served as the members of the Corporation of Dún Laoghaire, the council of the Borough of Dún Laoghaire.

From 1 January 1994, on the coming into effect of the Local Government (Dublin) Act 1993, County Dublin was disestablished as an administrative county, and in its place the electoral counties became three new counties. The Borough of Dún Laoghaire was also disestablished as of that date. The councillors listed below became the councillors for Dún Laoghaire–Rathdown County Council from that date.

Results by party

Results by electoral area

Ballybrack

Blackrock

Clonskeagh

Dundrum

Dún Laoghaire

Glencullen

Stillorgan

References

External links
 Official website
 irishelectionliterature

1991
1991